Pai Northern Thai Kitchen (simply Pai; stylized as PAI) is a restaurant chain in Toronto, Ontario, Canada serving northern Thai cuisine. Pai has two eat-in locations and three ghost kitchens. The chain is run by chefs Nuit Regular and Jeff Regular. Pai has been noted for its influence on Thai food in Toronto, and has been cited as one of the city's most liked spots for Thai food. Their menu focuses on authentic northern Thai cuisine with international influences; the most popular dish is their pad thai.

Nuit and Jeff had opened a number of Thai restaurants in Toronto before Pai. The first Pai location was opened in 2014 in Downtown Toronto. Following the opening, the Toronto Star left a positive review while The Globe and Mail left a mixed one. Pai opened a ghost kitchen with Kitchen Hub in early 2020 and an eat-in location in late 2020, situated in Yonge–Eglinton. They began operating a further two ghost kitchens in 2022.

History 
In the mid-2000s, there was a lack of "authentic" Thai food in Toronto. Jeff Regular and Thai-born Nuit Regular set out to fill this gap, and opened Sukhothai in 2008. The chefs continued to open Thai restaurants in Toronto, including Sabai Sabai Kitchen and Bar and Khao San Road. According to Eater Toronto, Khao San Road "may have single-handedly relaunched Thai cuisine into the trend-sphere of the city."

Nuit and Jeff opened Pai's first location in 18 Duncan St. (in Downtown Toronto). The grand opening occurred on July 5, 2014, although it was open since May 30. The restaurant was named after Pai, Thailand. In 2017, Nuit said they served 1,500 customers on a given busy day. In early 2020, Pai opened their first ghost kitchen—a restaurant which only provides takeout and delivery—to satisfy their high demand for takeout and delivery. Pai's first ghost kitchen is located within Kitchen Hub Etobicoke: a "virtual food hall" that hosts multiple ghost kitchens in the same location. Pai's second eat-in location, PAI Uptown, was opened in late 2020 at 2335 Yonge St. (in the Yonge–Eglinton neighbourhood). Jeff stated the restaurant shares similarities with the downtown location, but with "its own quirky personality". In 2022, Pai opened two more ghost kitchens at Kitchen Hub locations: Kitchen Hub Castlefield in March and Kitchen Hub Liberty Village in September.

Locations

Menu 
Pai intends to combine traditional Thai cooking with international influences and overall focuses on northern Thai cuisine. According to Jeff, Pai focuses more on northern Thai cuisine than their other restaurants. Michelin Guide described Pai's menu as "extensive," with "fresh, tasty dishes and vibrant curries". As of 2021, Pai's most popular dish is their pad thai; other popular dishes include their khao soi and pad gra prow. According to Nuit, she "really helped popularize and put on the food map" these aforementioned dishes in Toronto.

Reception 
Amy Pataki of the Toronto Star reviewed the restaurant in 2014 and gave it three-and-a-half out of four stars. According to Pataki, at Pai, "fun is as much the guiding principle as the excellent Thai food". Pataki praised the hunglay curry, tom yum goong, papaya salad, and fried morning glory.

Chris Nuttall-Smith of The Globe and Mail reviewed the restaurant in 2014 and discussed authenticity in Toronto's Thai food. While Nuttall-Smith said that Pai's Thai food is some of Toronto's best, they criticized it for its sweetness and lack of bitterness for being northern Thai. Nuttall-Smith gave the restaurant no stars (not recommended) and concluded "for Toronto, Pai is very, very good. But I dream of a day when a Thai restaurant in the city is worthy of praise without that 'for Toronto' bit."

According to Filipe Dimas of blogTO, Pai is one of "Toronto's favourite Thai restaurants"; similarly, Kayla Gladysz of Daily Hive called it "one of the city’s top spots for Thai cuisine". The Megan Ogilvie of the Toronto Star wrote that the restaurant is "credited with revitalizing Toronto’s Thai dining scene". According to Donna Paris of the Toronto Star, Nuit "has changed the way people think about Thai food" in Toronto. Notable patrons have included Jason Momoa, The Umbrella Academy cast, James Harden, and J. Cole.

References 

Restaurants in Toronto
Thai restaurants
Northern Thai cuisine